Joan Wyndham (1911–2000) was a British actress. She appeared in leading roles in several films of the 1930s such as The Fortunate Fool.

Filmography
 Call of the Circus (1930)
 Leave It to Me (1930)
 Up for the Cup (1931)
 High Society (1932)
 Josser on the River (1932)
 The Lucky Number (1932)
 The Fortunate Fool (1933)
 Loyalties (1933)
 Love's Old Sweet Song (1933)
 Gay Old Dog (1935)
 Juggernaut (1936)
 Smith (1949, TV film)

References

Bibliography
 Goble, Alan. The Complete Index to Literary Sources in Film. Walter de Gruyter, 1999.

External links

1911 births
2000 deaths
British film actresses
People from Westminster
Actresses from London